Prince Henry (or Prince Harry) may refer to:

People
Henry the Young King (1155–1183), son of Henry II of England, who was crowned king but predeceased his father
Prince Henry the Navigator of Portugal (1394–1460)
Henry, Duke of Cornwall (1511, 1513), first and second-born sons of Henry VIII of England and Catherine of Aragon, who both died in infancy
Henry Frederick, Prince of Wales (1593/94–1612), son of James I of England 
Prince Henry of Prussia (1726–1802), son of King Frederick William I of Prussia
Prince Henry, Count of Bardi (1851–1905)
Prince Heinrich of Prussia (1862–1929), son of Frederick III, German Emperor
Prince Henry, Duke of Gloucester (1900–1974), third son of George V of the United Kingdom
Prince Harry, Duke of Sussex (born 1984), second son of Charles III, and currently fifth in line to the throne of the United Kingdom

Fictional characters
Prince Hal or Prince Harry, a character in Shakespeare's Henry IV, based on the future King Henry V
Prince Harry (Blackadder), a fictional character in the first series of the British TV comedy Blackadder
Prince Harry (Axis of Time), a character in Axis of Time

Vehicles
 , a Canadian cruise liner and warship
 Vauxhall Prince Henry, a sports car of the 1910s

See also
 List of rulers named Henry
 Henry, Prince of Wales (disambiguation)
 Prince Henry of the Netherlands (disambiguation)
 Prince Henry of Prussia (disambiguation)
 Prince Henry's (disambiguation)